Rev. Matthew Armour (12 April 1820 – 23 March 1903) was a radical Free Church of Scotland minister on the island of Sanday, Orkney, remembered for supporting the island's crofters.

References
Centenary of a Radical Kirk Minister by Dr Stephen Clackson, The Orcadian. 6 March 2003. 
Sanday Church History. by Rev Alexander Goodfellow, W.R. Mackintosh (Kirkwall). 1912.
Two Old Pulpit Worthies by Rev Alexander Goodfellow, W.R. Rendall (Stromness). 1925.
An Orkney Anthology - The Selected Works of Ernest Walker Marwick, Vol. 1. edited by John D.M. Robertson, Scottish Academic Press (Edinburgh). 1991. 

1820 births
1903 deaths
People from Renfrewshire
Scottish politicians
People associated with Orkney
Alumni of the University of Glasgow
Alumni of the University of St Andrews
Crofting
19th-century Ministers of the Free Church of Scotland